Helen Osborne (11 March 1939 – 12 January 2004) was a British journalist and critic, and the fifth wife of the playwright John Osborne.

She was born Helen Dawson, in Newcastle-upon-Tyne, and educated at The Mount School, York, and Durham University, where she received a bachelor's degree in History.

She worked at The Observer for the arts editor Richard Findlater, becoming drama critic and then arts editor.

References

External links
 John Osborne and Helen Dawson Osborne Papers at the Harry Ransom Center

1939 births
2004 deaths
British critics
People educated at The Mount School, York
20th-century British journalists
Alumni of St Aidan's College, Durham
Deaths from cancer in England
Writers from Newcastle upon Tyne